Ramón Echegaray (born 1 April 1935) is a Venezuelan cyclist. He competed in the 4,000 metres team pursuit at the 1952 Summer Olympics.

References

1935 births
Living people
Venezuelan male cyclists
Olympic cyclists of Venezuela
Cyclists at the 1952 Summer Olympics
Place of birth missing (living people)
20th-century Venezuelan people